Kazaviaspas ( / ) is an airline based in Astana, Kazakhstan. It acts as the aviation element of the Emergency Committee of the Ministry of Internal Affairs of the Republic of Kazakhstan.

Fleet
The Kazaviaspas fleet consists of the following aircraft (as of October 2018):

Uses the following own helicopters: Mi-26, Ka-32, EC145, Mi8, Mi-171.

Accidents and Incidents
On February 23, 2023, a Kazaviaspas Mi-8AMT helicopter crashed near the village of Chaperino, Bayterek District, in the West Kazakhstan Region of Kazakhstan. Four of the six occupants were killed.

References

 

Airlines of Kazakhstan
Airlines established in 2003
Airlines formerly banned in the European Union
Helicopter airlines